The Maulana Abul Kalam Hyderabad Sujala Saravanthi scheme is a drinking water project in Hyderabad on the Godavari River. It is expected to start by December 2013. It draws water through the Yellampalli project.

The Project
The total pipeline length is 186 km. It passes through the Karimnagar, Medak and Ranga Reddy districts at an expected cost of 3375 crores.

References

Hyderabad district, India
Water supply infrastructure in India
Proposed infrastructure in Telangana
Memorials to Abul Kalam Azad
Proposed water supply infrastructure